The Koka Reservoir is a reservoir in south-central Ethiopia. It was created by the construction of the Koka Dam across the Awash River. The reservoir has an area of 180 square kilometers.

Geography
Located in the East(Baha) Shewa Zone of the Oromia Region, close to the capital and largest city of Ethiopia, Addis Ababa, the Koka Reservoir is popular with tourists and city-dwellers. There is a variety of wildlife and birds around the lake. The reservoir supports a fishing industry; according to the Ethiopian Department of Fisheries and Aquaculture, 625 tonnes of fish are landed each year, which the department estimates is either 52% or 89% of its sustainable amount. Both the reservoir and the dam are threatened by increasing sedimentation caused by environmental degradation as well as the invasive water hyacinth.

Architecture
The Koka dam consists of concrete with a length of 458 meters and a maximum height of 47 meters. The head utilized is 32–42 meters. The transmission lines have voltage 132 kV. The primary contractor was Imprese Italiane all'Estero. The subcontractor who provided the equipment was Gruppo Industriale Elettro Meccaniche per Impiante all'Estero, and subcontractor for mounting the equipment and the erection of the transmission lines was Società Anonima Elettrificazione. Construction started in December 1957 and was formally dedicated on 4 May 1960; the budget was Eth$ 30,641,000. The power plant began full operation on 28 August 1960.  Addis Ababa is the primary benefactor. The total potential electric output is 110 GWh/year.

Notes 

Awash River
Oromia Region
Reservoirs in Ethiopia
Dams in Ethiopia
1960 establishments in Africa
Important Bird Areas of Ethiopia